A pied-à-terre (plural: pieds-à-terre; French for "foot on the ground") is a small living unit, e.g., apartment or condominium, often located in a large city and not used as an individual's primary residence. The term implies use of the property as a temporary second residence, but not a vacation home, either for part of the year or part of the work week, usually by a reasonably wealthy person. If the owner's primary residence is nearby, the term also implies that the residence allows the owner to use their primary residence as a vacation home.

Pieds-à-terre attracted discussion during the 2010s in Paris and New York, where they are argued to cause a reduction in the overall housing supply. A tax on such units has been discussed since 2014. A 2019 bill in the New York State Assembly that would place a recurring tax on luxury pieds-à-terre was blocked after intense pressure from real estate developers and their lobbyists.

New York City
In 2014, The New York Times reported 57% of units on one three-block stretch of midtown Manhattan were vacant over half of the year. Many of the buildings mentioned border Central Park and have become known as Billionaires' Row. New York State Senator Liz Krueger, whose district includes Midtown, stated:
My district has some of the most expensive land values in the world—I’m ground zero for the issue of foreign buyers. I met with a developer who is building one of those billionaire buildings on 57th Street and he told me, "Don't worry, you won't need any more services, because the buyers won't be sending their kids to school here, there won't be traffic."
Some cooperative buildings in New York City have restrictions on pied-à-terre purchasers.

France
As of 2010, French cities with more than 200,000 people had a minimum year-long lease on apartments to crack down on pieds-à-terre being offered as short-term rentals.

Amsterdam
While pieds-à-terre have historically been less common in the Netherlands, they have become subject to regulation in Amsterdam.

See also

 Maisonette
 Commuting
 Vacation property

References 

House types
Residential real estate
Property taxes